Prochelidella is an extinct genus of Early to Late Cretaceous chelid turtles from the Bajo Barreal, Candeleros, Cerro Barcino and Portezuelo Formations of the Cañadón Asfalto, Golfo San Jorge and Neuquén Basins in Patagonia, Argentina. It includes the following species:

 P. argentinae 
 P. buitreraensis 
 P. cerrobarcinae 
 P. palomoi 
 P. portezuelae

References

Chelidae
Fossil Chelid Turtles
Prehistoric turtle genera
Cretaceous turtles
Albian life
Cenomanian life
Coniacian life
Turonian life
Early Cretaceous reptiles of South America
Late Cretaceous reptiles of South America
Cretaceous Argentina
Fossils of Argentina
Bajo Barreal Formation
Candeleros Formation
Cerro Barcino Formation
Portezuelo Formation
Fossil taxa described in 2001